Erin Michelle Yenney (born October 20, 1992) is an American professional soccer player who plays as a midfielder for Fenerbahçe of the Turkish Women Football League.

Club career

Chicago Red Stars, 2018
On March 25, 2018, Erin Yenney made her debut for Chicago Red Stars in a 1–1 draw against Houston Dash.

Reign FC, 2019
Reign FC signed Yenney as a National Team Replacement player on June 14, 2019. She was subsequently released on July 15 without making an appearance for the club.

Åland United, 2019–
Yenney signed with Finnish club Åland United in August 2019.

References

External links
 

1992 births
Living people
National Women's Soccer League players
Chicago Red Stars players
People from Troy, Ohio
Soccer players from Ohio
Louisville Cardinals women's soccer players
American women's soccer players
Women's association football midfielders
OL Reign players
Fenerbahçe S.K. women's football players
Expatriate women's footballers in Turkey
American expatriate sportspeople in Turkey